Josef Klein (12 November 1916 – 1941) was a Czech athlete. He competed in the men's javelin throw and the men's decathlon at the 1936 Summer Olympics. He was killed during World War II.

References

1916 births
1941 deaths
Athletes (track and field) at the 1936 Summer Olympics
Czech male javelin throwers
Czech decathletes
Olympic athletes of Czechoslovakia
Place of birth missing
Czechoslovak military personnel killed in World War II